Tamam may refer to:

Tamam, witch in Papua New Guinea animism
Tamam Al-Akhal (born 1935), Palestinian artist and educator living in Jordan
Israel Aerospace Industries Tamam Division, of the Systems Missiles and Space Group of the Israel Aerospace Industries (IAI) 
Tamam (TV series), Greek TV comedy

See also
Tamam Shud, Australian band
Tamam Shud, Australian death case
Taman (disambiguation)
Tammam, a given name and surname